The sport of football in the country of El Salvador is run by the Salvadoran Football Association. The association administers the national football team, as well as the Primera División de Fútbol de El Salvador, the top level in its league system. Football is the most popular sport in the country.

National team

El Salvador qualified for the FIFA World Cup twice, in 1970 and 1982. On both occasions the team was eliminated in the first round after losing all three matches.

A qualifying match against Honduras for the 1970 tournament was so hotly contested that it was the spark that brought a state of war between El Salvador and Honduras. The conflict became known as the Football War.

The 1982 tournament included a 10-1 mauling from Hungary that provided the most goals in a game in the history of the finals as well as equalling the record for winning margin.

Outside of the World Cup, El Salvador competes regularly at the CONCACAF Gold Cup and the CONCACAF Nations League. Its sole international triumph came in a regional competition, the 1943 CCCF Championship.

League system
The main league competition in El Salvador is the Primera División de Fútbol de El Salvador. It is fed into by the Segunda División de Fútbol Salvadoreño which in turn is fed into by the Tercera Division de Fútbol Salvadoreño. The most successful team has been C.D. FAS with 18 league titles, followed by C.D. Águila with 14. The top Salvadorean clubs also participate in the CONCACAF Champions League, a competition won by Alianza F.C. in 1967 and C.D. Águila in 1976. Alianza and C.D. Platense Municipal Zacatecoluca have also won the defunct Copa Interclubes UNCAF once each.

Football stadiums in El Salvador

References